Sandstorm (translit. Rih al-raml) is a 1982 Algerian drama film directed by Mohammed Lakhdar-Hamina. It was entered into the 1982 Cannes Film Festival. The film was also selected as the Algerian entry for the Best Foreign Language Film at the 55th Academy Awards, but was not accepted as a nominee.

Cast
 Nadir Benguedih
 Himmoud Brahimi
 Hadja
 Sabrina Hannach
 Merwan Lakhdar-Hamina
 M. Mahboub
 Albert Minski
 Leila Shenna
 Sissani
 Nadia Talbi

See also
 List of submissions to the 55th Academy Awards for Best Foreign Language Film
 List of Algerian submissions for the Academy Award for Best Foreign Language Film

References

External links

1982 films
1980s French-language films
1982 drama films
Films directed by Mohammed Lakhdar-Hamina
Algerian drama films